Eugeniusz Durejko (born 15 November 1950) is a Polish former basketball player. He competed in the men's tournament at the 1972 Summer Olympics.

References

1950 births
Living people
Polish men's basketball players
Olympic basketball players of Poland
Basketball players at the 1972 Summer Olympics
People from Ostróda
Sportspeople from Warmian-Masurian Voivodeship
Lech Poznań (basketball) players